The 1947 Clemson Tigers football team was an American football team that represented Clemson College during the 1947 college football season. In its eighth season under head coach Frank Howard, the team compiled a 4–5 record (1–3 against conference opponents) and outscored opponents by a total of 206 to 146. The team played its home games at Memorial Stadium in Clemson, South Carolina.

Cary Cox was the team captain. The team's statistical leaders included tailback Bobby Gage with 1,002 passing yards and 502 rushing yards and wingback Jim Reynolds with 48 points scored (8 touchdowns).

Three Clemson player were named to the 1947 All-South Carolina football team: guard Frank Gillespie, center Cary Cox, and back Bobby Gage.

Schedule

References

Clemson
Clemson Tigers football seasons
Clemson Tigers football